Heimtali is a village in Viljandi Parish, Viljandi County, Estonia. It has a population of 235 (as of 4 January 2010).

Heimtali Manor

Heimtali estate has a history that goes back to at least 1528, when it is mentioned in written sources for the first time. It was the property of different Baltic German local aristocratic families for most of its history. The current main building dates from 1855-1857 and was designed by the owner at the time, Peter Reinhold von Sievers. In its heyday during the 19th century, the manor house complex supported over 40 outbuildings and was surrounded by a park. Of the outbuildings, the peculiar former cheese dairy has been renovated. The von Sievers family burial ground is still located nearby.

See also
 List of palaces and manor houses in Estonia

References

External links
Heimtali manor at Estonian Manors Portal

Villages in Viljandi County
Kreis Fellin